Rotund for Success is a studio album by the Australian electronic music group Severed Heads, released in 1989. Three singles were released from the album: "Greater Reward", "All Saints Day" and "Big Car", the first two reaching the top 30 on [[Billboard magazine|''Billboards]] Dance Club Songs chart. Much like the rest of the band's discography, the album has been issued many times in several formats through a variety of labels.

Critical reception
Trouser Press wrote that "[Tom] Ellard’s lyrical sensibility is typically off-kilter and flashes of a twisted mind do erupt now and again in the mix, but the diminution of musical disturbance and the elimination of the band’s creative challenge is most disturbing." Option wrote that "each song has a catchy simple melody defined by a 'cheap & nasty synthesizer with knobs.'"

Track listing2021 Medical Records 2LP reissue'''

Personnel
Tom Ellard - vocals, synthesizers, production
Stephen Jones - photography, circuit design, video synthesizers
Robert Racic - production
Wayne Miller - co-production
Adrian Bolland - co-production
Repo Graphics - cover artwork
Tony Mott - photography

Release history

References

External links
 
 Bandcamp web page

Severed Heads albums
1989 albums